HD 219134 b (or HR 8832 b) is one of at least five exoplanets orbiting HD 219134, a main-sequence star in the constellation of Cassiopeia. HD 219134 b has a size of about 1.6 , and a density of 6.4 g/cm3 and orbits at 21.25 light-years away. The exoplanet was initially detected by the instrument HARPS-N of the Italian Telescopio Nazionale Galileo via the radial velocity method and subsequently observed by the Spitzer telescope as transiting in front of its star. The exoplanet has a mass of about 4.5 times that of Earth and orbits its host star every three days. In 2017, it was found that the planet likely hosts an atmosphere.

Characteristics

Mass, radius and temperature
HD 219134 b is a super-Earth, an exoplanet with a radius and mass bigger than Earth, but smaller than that of the ice giants Neptune and Uranus. Using both the radial velocity and transit method, both its mass and radius have been well determined, allowing for accurate modelling of the planet's composition. HD 219134 b has a radius of 1.602  and a mass of 4.74 , giving it a density of about 6.4 g/cm3 and 1.85 times the gravity of Earth. This is consistent with a rocky, Earth-like composition. This is relatively unusual, as most planets of ≥1.6  are expected to be rich in volatile materials, such as water and gas. Depending on the amount of cloud cover in the atmosphere of HD 219134 b, the actual temperature may be somewhat lower, but nowhere near the range for liquid water.

Host star
The planet orbits a (K-type) star named HD 219134, orbited by a total of five to seven planets. The star has a mass of 0.81  and a radius of 0.778 . It has a temperature of 4699 K and is about 11.0 billion years old, making it one of the oldest stars. In comparison, the Sun is 4.6 billion years old and has a temperature of 5778 K.

The star's apparent magnitude, or how bright it appears from Earth's perspective, is 5. It can be seen with the naked eye.

Orbit
HD 219134 b orbits its host star with about 28% of the Sun's luminosity with an orbital period of 3 days and an orbital radius of about 0.03 times that of Earth's (compared to the distance of Mercury from the Sun, which is about 0.38 AU).

Atmosphere
In 2017, it was predicted that HD 219134 b and HD 219134 c likely have atmospheres that are secondary in nature, based on the compositions of the planets and the potential for atmospheric escape. For HD 219134 b, the predicted atmosphere was calculated to reach a height of about 0.18  (~1,150 km), below the predicted height of a primordial hydrogen atmosphere (0.28 ). This would indicate a secondary atmosphere produced by processes like volcanic activity and evaporation of volatile materials. However, the composition of volatile materials on HD 219134 b and c could not be accurately determined, yet it is believed that the former has a very thin gaseous envelope, far thinner than those of Uranus and Neptune.

See also
 List of exoplanet extremes
 Other rocky planets with confirmed atmospheres:
 TRAPPIST-1b and TRAPPIST-1c
 Gliese 1132 b, has an atmosphere rich in water and methane.
 55 Cancri e, has an atmosphere with hydrogen, helium, hydrogen cyanide, nitrogen, and/or carbon monoxide.

References

External links
 Cassiopeia Constellation at Constellation Guide
 The Deep Photographic Guide to the Constellations: Cassiopeia

Cassiopeia (constellation)
Exoplanets discovered in 2015
Terrestrial planets
Transiting exoplanets
Exoplanets detected by radial velocity
Near-Earth-sized exoplanets
Articles containing video clips